The United Nations Educational, Scientific and Cultural Organization (UNESCO) World Heritage Sites are places of importance to cultural or natural heritage as described in the UNESCO World Heritage Convention, established in 1972. Cultural heritage consists of monuments (such as architectural works, monumental sculptures, or inscriptions), groups of buildings, and sites (including archaeological sites). Natural features (consisting of physical and biological formations), geological and physiographical formations (including habitats of threatened species of animals and plants), and natural sites which are important from the point of view of science, conservation or natural beauty, are defined as natural heritage. The Slovak Republic ratified the convention on 31 March 1993, making its historical sites eligible for inclusion on the list.

, there are eight World Heritage Sites in Slovakia. The first three sites in Slovakia were added to the list in 1993. These sites were Vlkolínec, Historic Town of Banská Štiavnica and the Technical Monuments in its Vicinity, and Spišský Hrad. The latter site was extended in 2009 to include Levoča and the associated cultural monuments. The most recent site added to the list was the Danube Limes, in 2021. Six sites in Slovakia are cultural and two are natural. Three sites are transnational, the Caves of Aggtelek Karst and Slovak Karst are shared with Hungary, the Danube Limes is shared with Germany and Austria, and the Ancient and Primeval Beech Forests of the Carpathians and Other Regions of Europe are shared with 17 other countries. In addition, Slovakia has 12 sites on the tentative list.



World Heritage Sites 
UNESCO lists sites under ten criteria; each entry must meet at least one of the criteria. Criteria i through vi are cultural, and vii through x are natural.

Tentative list 
In addition to sites inscribed on the World Heritage list, member states can maintain a list of tentative sites that they may consider for nomination. Nominations for the World Heritage list are only accepted if the site was previously listed on the tentative list. , Slovakia recorded 12 sites on its tentative list.

References

Slovakia
 
World Heritage Sites